FC Syzran-2003 is a Russian football club from Syzran, founded in 2003. It played its first professional season in the Russian Second Division in 2011.

On 15 June 2016, the club announced that will not participate in the professional-level competitions in the 2016–17 season. However, on 29 June 2016 the club received the professional license for the season.

On 21 June 2018 it was announced that FC Syzran-2003 is dissolved because of financial problems. But on 1 July it was officially confirmed that FC Syzran-2003 will participate in the 2018–19 Russian Professional Football League (it ended the season in 3rd place). It decided not to participate professionally in the 2019–20 season.

References

External links
Official Website

Association football clubs established in 2003
Football clubs in Russia
Sport in Samara Oblast
2003 establishments in Russia